The 1975 Campeonato Ecuatoriano de Fútbol de la Serie A was the 17th national championship for football teams in Ecuador. LDU Quito successfully defended their title for their third overall.

Teams
The number of teams for this season was expanded from eight to twelve. There would be no mid-season replacements.

First stage

Second stage

Liguilla Final

References
General

Specific

External links
Official website 

1975
Ecu
Football